The Lonesome River Band is an American contemporary bluegrass band.  The band has released 15 recording projects since its formation in 1982. Lonesome River Band is led by Sammy Shelor who is a member of the Virginia Country Music Hall of Fame and a 5-Time International Bluegrass Music Association Banjo Player of the Year Award recipient. The band has experienced numerous personnel changes over the years, and has not included an original member since Tim Austin left the band in 1995 to focus on Doobie Shea Records.

On November 11, 2011, band member Sammy Shelor was awarded the Steve Martin Prize for Excellence in Bluegrass and Banjo. Shelor was presented with the award on the Late Show with David Letterman.  Following the presentation of the award, Steve Martin performed with the Lonesome River Band.

Members

Current members
Mike Hartgrove — fiddle
Jesse Smathers — mandolin, vocals
Barry Reed – bass, vocals
Brandon Rickman – guitar, vocals
Sammy Shelor — banjo, guitar, bass, vocals
Derrick Clifton — sound board operator, bus driver

Previous members
Tim Austin – guitar, banjo, bass, vocals
Jerry McMillan – bass, vocals
Steve Thomas — fiddle, mandolin, vocals
Rick Williams — banjo
Jeff Midkiff — mandolin, fiddle, vocals
Billy Wheeler — banjo, dobro, guitar
Randy Driskill — banjo, vocals
Adam Steffey — mandolin, vocals
Brian Fesler — banjo, guitar, vocals
Dan Tyminski — mandolin, guitar, vocals
Dale Perry — banjo, guitar, vocals
John Green – bass, vocals
Ronnie Bowman — bass, guitar, vocals
Steve Dilling — banjo, vocals
Darrell Webb — mandolin, vocals
Don Rigsby — mandolin, vocals
 Kenny Smith — guitar, vocals
Rickie Simpkins — fiddle, vocals
Jeff Parker — mandolin, vocals
Irl Hees – bass, vocals
John Wade – bass, vocals
Shannon Slaughter – guitar, vocals
Barry Berrier – bass, vocals
Matt Leadbetter — dobro, vocals
Mike Anglin – bass, vocals
Andy Ball — mandolin, piano, vocals
Mike Jones — banjo
Randy Jones — mandolin, vocals

Guests
Mike Auldridge — steel guitar (The Lonesome River Band)
Steve Thomas — fiddle (Saturday Night-Sunday Morning, Carrying The Tradition)
Stuart Duncan — fiddle (Looking For Yourself, Old Country Town)
Alison Krauss — fiddle (Carrying The Tradition)
Bobby Hicks — fiddle (Carrying The Tradition)
Kim Gardner — dobro (Carrying The Tradition)
Ricky Simpkins — fiddle (Old Country Town)
Kenneth Smith – drums (Old Country Town)
Aubrey Haynie — fiddle (One Step Forward)
Randy Howard — fiddle (One Step Forward, Finding The Way)
Jerry Douglas — dobro, Weissenborn guitar (One Step Forward, Finding The Way)
Jason Carter — fiddle (Finding The Way)
Dan Tyminski — harmony vocals (Talkin to Myself)
Ron Stewart — fiddle (The Road With No End)

Discography

Albums

References

External links
 
 CMT.com: Lonesome River Band: Biography
 Steve Martin Honors Another Banjo Player

American bluegrass music groups